Virtual File System for Git (VFS for Git), developed by Microsoft, is an extension to the Git version control system.

Overview
VFS for Git is designed to ease the handling of enterprise-scale Git repositories, such as the Microsoft Windows operating system (whose development switched to Git under Microsoft's internal "One Engineering System" initiative). The system exposes a virtual file system that only downloads files to local storage as they are needed.

History
VFS for Git was originally named Git Virtual File System (GVFS).  However due to complaints by the developers of GNOME over confusion with GNOME Virtual File System, Microsoft announced that it would solicit ideas for a new name of the software in June 2018, following its acquisition of GitHub.  Its first release under the new name was in August 2018.

In November 2017, GitHub announced that it would support VFS for Git.

VFS for Git has been superseded by Scalar. Scalar was then integrated into the Microsoft Git project.

See also

Version control

References

External links
 
 Virtual File System for Git on GitHub

Free and open-source software
Git (software)
Microsoft free software
Software using the MIT license